Horse Mountain is a prominent mountain summit in the San Juan Mountains range of the Rocky Mountains of North America.

See also

List of Colorado mountain ranges
List of Colorado mountain summits
List of Colorado fourteeners
List of Colorado 4000 meter prominent summits
List of the most prominent summits of Colorado
List of Colorado county high points

References

External links

Mountains of Archuleta County, Colorado
San Juan Mountains (Colorado)
North American 3000 m summits
San Juan National Forest
Mountains of Colorado